Yoncalla High School is a public high school in Yoncalla, Oregon, United States.

Academics
In 2008, 79% of the school's seniors received a high school diploma. Of 33 students, 26 graduated, four dropped out, one received a modified diploma, and two were still in high school the following year.

References

External links 
 
 Yoncalla School District

High schools in Douglas County, Oregon
Public high schools in Oregon
Public middle schools in Oregon